Toukouroua (also Tukorua, Takoura, Tukurua) is a village in the commune of Banyo in the department of Mayo-Banyo in the Adamawa Region of Cameroon, near the .

Population 
In 1967, Toukouroua contained 215 inhabitants, mostly Fula people.

At the time of the 2005 census, there were 998 people in the village.

References

Bibliography 
 Jean Boutrais, 1993, Peuples et cultures de l'Adamaoua (Cameroun) : actes du colloque de Ngaoundéré du 14 au 16 janvier 1992, Paris : Éd. de l'ORSTOM u.a.
 Dictionnaire des villages de l'Adamaoua, ONAREST, Yaoundé, October 1974, 133 p.

External links 
 Banyo, on the website Communes et villes unies du Cameroun (CVUC)

Populated places in Adamawa Region